Tanque (born 18 July 1991 in Goiânia) is a Hungarian football player who plays for Zalaegerszegi TE.

Club statistics

External links
 Profile 

1991 births
Living people
Sportspeople from Goiânia
Brazilian footballers
Association football forwards
Egri FC players
Zalaegerszegi TE players
Nemzeti Bajnokság I players
Brazilian expatriate footballers
Expatriate footballers in Hungary
Brazilian expatriate sportspeople in Hungary